Seeing Is Believing is a 1934 British comedy crime film directed by Redd Davis and starring William Hartnell, Gus McNaughton and Faith Bennett. It was made at British and Dominions Elstree Studios as a quota quickie for release by Paramount Pictures.

Cast
 William Hartnell as Ronald Gibson  
 Gus McNaughton as Geoffrey Cooper  
 Faith Bennett as Marion Harvey  
 Vera Bogetti as Nita Leonard  
 Fewlass Llewellyn as Sir Robert Gibson  
 Joana Pereira as Mme. Bellini  
 Elsie Irving as Lady Mander 
 Pat Baring

References

Bibliography
 Low, Rachael. Filmmaking in 1930s Britain. George Allen & Unwin, 1985.
 Wood, Linda. British Films, 1927-1939. British Film Institute, 1986.

External links

1934 films
British crime comedy films
Films directed by Redd Davis
Quota quickies
British black-and-white films
British and Dominions Studios films
Films shot at Imperial Studios, Elstree
1930s crime comedy films
1934 comedy films
1930s English-language films
1930s British films